Sam de Jong (born 20 March 1989) is a record producer and songwriter from Auckland, New Zealand, based in Los Angeles, California.



Career 
Making his start in the music industry at 16 years old as a touring drummer, Sam is best known for his work as a producer and songwriter for artists including; Pink, Rudimental, Alec Benjamin, Lennon Stella, Gracie Abrams, Amy Shark, Marina, Little Mix, Pale Waves, Noah Kahan, Maisie Peters, Anson Seabra, Thirty Seconds to Mars, Gary Clark Jr & Muse.

De Jong is published by Sony Music Publishing, and is based in Los Angeles.

Select discography

References

New Zealand songwriters
Male songwriters
New Zealand record producers
New Zealand expatriates in the United States
Living people
1989 births
People educated at St Peter's College, Auckland